Jocelyn von Giese (born 19 July 1936) is a Filipino former swimmer. She competed in the women's 100 metre backstroke at the 1956 Summer Olympics. She is the sister of Sandra von Giese.

References

External links
 

1936 births
Living people
Filipino female swimmers
Olympic swimmers of the Philippines
Swimmers at the 1956 Summer Olympics
Place of birth missing (living people)
Asian Games medalists in swimming
Asian Games gold medalists for the Philippines
Swimmers at the 1954 Asian Games
Swimmers at the 1958 Asian Games
Medalists at the 1954 Asian Games
Medalists at the 1958 Asian Games
Female backstroke swimmers